Cheiracanthium elegans is a species of spider in the genus Cheiracanthium found in Europe and Central Asia.

References 

elegans
Spiders of Asia
Spiders described in 1875
Spiders of Europe